Dariusz Podolski (born 17 June 1966) is a retired Polish football midfielder.

References

1966 births
Living people
Polish footballers
ŁKS Łódź players
Zawisza Bydgoszcz players
Widzew Łódź players
Wisła Płock players
Hapoel Beit She'an F.C. players
Świt Nowy Dwór Mazowiecki players
Tur Turek players
Association football midfielders
Polish expatriate footballers
Expatriate footballers in Israel
Polish expatriate sportspeople in Israel
Footballers from Łódź